Andrey Valeryevich Tikhonov (born 16 October 1970) is a Russian football manager and a former midfielder who was recently the manager of Kazakhstani club Astana. Tikhonov is primarily known for having played for Spartak Moscow and the Russia national football team.

Career
Tikhonov was spotted by the then-Spartak manager Oleg Romantsev, while playing for Titan Reutov, in a game against Spartak Moscow reserves. Tikhonov quickly broke into the starting line-up at his new club, becoming a key player at Spartak soon afterwards. Tikhonov won a total of eight Russian League titles with Spartak, before falling out with Oleg Romantsev. He then had a short loan spell in Israel, before signing a contract with Krylia Sovetov Samara. In February 2001, Tikhonov was training with Southampton, even featuring in one friendly for the club, but no deal was reached, mainly because the player already had a running one-year contract with Krylia Sovetov at the time.

An icon among Spartak fans, Tikhonov is often viewed as an underachiever on the international stage. He made his international debut in 1996, in a friendly against Malta.

In early 2011, he announced that he would be returning to Spartak Moscow but it was initially unconfirmed whether the 40-year-old midfielder would get playing time or whether he would simply be a coach. Later however, it was confirmed that he would be part of the squad.

He then started for the red-and-whites in a cup quarter-final game against FC Krasnodar on 20 April 2011. He got a warm reception from the home fans and was substituted off in the second half. On 18 September 2011, Tikonov has played his farewell match as Spartak defeated his former team, Krylya Sovetov, 3–0. Tikhonov made an assist and participated in another attack that ended with a goal before being substituted just before the end of the first half.

Coaching career
On 1 June 2017, he left FC Yenisey Krasnoyarsk to join FC Krylia Sovetov Samara as a manager. He returned FC Krylia Sovetov Samara back to the Russian Premier League at the end of the 2017–18 season. After 9 games in the 2018–19 season, with Krylia in the 15th place, Tikhonov was dismissed from Krylia Sovetov.

On 24 October 2021, the club Tikhonov was managing, FC Astana, left the field for 20 minutes in a Kazakhstan Premier League game against FC Kairat to protest the refereeing. Astana returned to the game and the match was finished. On 27 October 2021, Kazakhstan Football Federation banned Tikhonov from any official football activity in Kazakhstan for 2 years.

Records and honours
Scored 8 goals in one game for FC Spartak-d Moscow in a 1993 Russian Second League 8–0 victory over FC Rekord Aleksandrov. That was a Russian professional football record for most goals in one game he shared with Sergey Maslov and Gennady Korkin until Igor Kiselyov scored 10 goals in one game in 2001.
Russian First Division best player: 2005, 2010.
CIS Cup top goalscorer: 1997 (shared)

Personal life
His son Mikhail Tikhonov is now a professional footballer.

References

External links
Biography at Krylia Sovetov's website 
Andrey Tikhonov's blog 
Tikhonov might play for Spartak 

1970 births
Living people
People from Korolyov, Moscow Oblast
Russian footballers
Association football midfielders
Russia international footballers
Russian expatriate footballers
Expatriate footballers in Israel
Russian expatriate sportspeople in Israel
Expatriate footballers in Kazakhstan
Russian expatriate sportspeople in Kazakhstan
Russian Premier League players
Kazakhstan Premier League players
FC Spartak Moscow players
FC Spartak-2 Moscow players
Maccabi Tel Aviv F.C. players
PFC Krylia Sovetov Samara players
FC Khimki players
FC Astana players
Russian football managers
Russian Premier League managers
FC Yenisey Krasnoyarsk managers
PFC Krylia Sovetov Samara managers
FC Astana managers
Russian expatriate football managers
Expatriate football managers in Kazakhstan
Sportspeople from Moscow Oblast